The Fordham Rams men's basketball team represents Fordham University, located in the Bronx, New York, in NCAA Division I basketball competition. They compete in the Atlantic 10 Conference. The Rams play their home games at the Rose Hill Gymnasium (3,200), the nation's oldest on-campus collegiate basketball arena still in use. On February 28, 1940, Fordham University played in the nation's first televised college basketball game, when the Rams fell to Pitt at Madison Square Garden. Fordham hired former assistant coach Keith Urgo on April 28, 2022.

Post-season

NCAA tournament results
The Rams have appeared in four NCAA Tournaments. Their record is 2–4. Fordham also participated in a play-in game prior to the 1991 NCAA Tournament before the tournament field was announced, featuring the champions of the six conferences with the lowest computer ratings the previous season; the Rams played St. Francis, losing 70–64.

NIT results
The Rams have appeared in 16 National Invitation Tournaments (NIT). Their combined record is 5–17.

CIT results
The Rams have appeared in one CollegeInsider.com Postseason Tournament (CIT). Their record is 0–1.

Notable Rams basketball players

Retired numbers

All-American Rams

Rams in the NBA
Johnny Bach
Ken Charles
Fred Christ
Ed Conlin
Bob Fitzgerald
Dick Fitzgerald
Dan O'Sullivan
Smush Parker
Eric Paschall
Charlie Yelverton

Rams in other pro leagues
Jermaine Anderson
Bryant Dunston
Damon Lopez
Tom Sullivan
Anthony B. Karpowich (Capt. '47) - New York Gothams, ABL 1947-48

Rams to coach in NCAA or NBA
P. J. Carlesimo
Jean Prioleau
 Jerry Hobbie
 Tom Parrotta

References

External links